The Roman Catholic Diocese of Sambalpur is a diocese located in the city of Sambalpur in the Ecclesiastical province of Cuttack-Bhubaneswar in India.

History
 14 June 1951: Established as Diocese of Sambalpur from the Roman Catholic Archdiocese of Calcutta, Diocese of Nagpur and Diocese of Ranchi

Leadership
 Bishops of Sambalpur (Latin Church)
Hermann Westermann (14 June 1951 – 28 February 1974)
 Raphael Cheenath (later Archbishop) (28 February 1974 – 1 July 1985)
 Lucas Kerketta (17 November 1986 – 26 July 2013)
 Niranjan Sual Singh (28 September 2013 – present)

References
 GCatholic.org
 Catholic Hierarchy

Roman Catholic dioceses in India
Christian organizations established in 1951
Roman Catholic dioceses and prelatures established in the 20th century
Christianity in Odisha
1951 establishments in Orissa
Sambalpur